Lobulia fortis, or the Mount Strong moss skink, is a species of skink endemic to Papua New Guinea.

References

Lobulia
Reptiles described in 2021
Reptiles of Papua New Guinea
Endemic fauna of Papua New Guinea
Skinks of New Guinea